Arrow's Fall is a 1988 fantasy novel by American writer Mercedes Lackey. It is the third of the original Heralds of Valdemar trilogy.

Plot summary
Having completed her year and a half interning in the field, Talia returns to Haven as Queen's Own Herald in right. In her absence, the Council of Valdemar has been considering an offer of an alliance marriage between Princess Elspeth and the Prince of Hardorn, a young man named Ancar. While the Council is generally in favor, Queen Selenay has her suspicions about the idea, and she and Talia overrule the Council. Meanwhile, the budding lifebond between Talia and Herald Dirk is frustrated due to a misunderstanding - Dirk thinks Talia is in love with his best friend, the handsome Herald Kris. The problems of the kingdom occupy Talia's time so completely that she cannot speak to him, nor spend as much time with the young Princess as she used to. As a result, Dirk falls into depression (worsened by the death of a young Herald who was his special pupil) and begins drinking heavily. Elspeth, through the work of a trusted Councilor, Lord Orthallen, begins spending time with unsavory young men.

Dirk is falsely accused by Orthallen, and when Kris (Orthallen's nephew) does not immediately believe his innocence, the two have a falling-out. Dirk's slide into depression continues, and he neglects his health until he collapses from pneumonia.

Talia becomes caught up in all of these seemingly unsolvable problems and briefly loses her emotional footing, but her friends reassure her that the lifebond will work itself out in time. Then things fall apart again; Elspeth's new circle of male friends plan to seduce and then disgrace the Princess. Talia arrives just in time; she drives off the young cad, and then she and Elspeth have an argument. Afterwards, Talia confesses what she has done to Queen Selenay, who reassures her that she did the right thing by scolding Elspeth. The Queen then sends Talia and Kris on a mission to Hardorn to investigate Prince Ancar, in case the alliance marriage could be pursued after all.

Talia and Kris (who has resolved his quarrel with Dirk) arrive in Hardorn, and witness Ancar murdering his own father and the Hardornen court. As they themselves are trying to escape, Kris and his Companion are killed, and Talia, wounded, is taken prisoner. Rolan, Talia's Companion, escapes, and Talia is able to use him to deliver a message to Selenay and her retinue, who would otherwise have come into the city. Warned, the Queen stops at the border between Hardorn and Valdemar.

Talia has managed to convey to them that Kris is dead and that there is no hope for her. In desperation, Dirk and Elspeth use their Gifts (she is able to see at great distances, he is able to lift and move objects with his mind) and the strength of the Companion herd to pull her out of Ancar's dungeon. She is severely injured, for Ancar has tortured and raped her, and she drank a large amount of poison as a suicide attempt. The impossible feat leaves both Elspeth and Dirk incapacitated for some time.

Talia revives and remembers some information Ancar has told her; Orthallen is a secret agent who is working for Hardorn because Ancar has promised to give him the throne. Through his manipulations, he has been working in various ways to see to it that Elspeth never becomes Queen. The Princess and Talia set up a trap to reveal his guilt; when he attacks the two women, Elspeth executes him. While still in recovery, Talia makes Dirk understand that she loves him. Ancar's army marches against Selenay, but she defeats them, and the two countries settle into an uneasy standstill. The hostile situation is not completely resolved until the end of the Mage Winds trilogy.

The conclusion of the book is the wedding between Talia and Dirk.

External links
 Mercedes Lackey "Arrows of the Fall" Book Webpage

1988 American novels
American fantasy novels
Valdemar Universe
DAW Books books